The women's 400 metre freestyle S8 event at the 2016 Paralympic Games took place on 8 September 2016, at the Olympic Aquatics Stadium. Two heats were held, the first with six swimmers and the second with seven swimmers. The swimmers with the eight fastest times advanced to the final, which was won by Australia's Lakeisha Patterson, in a world record time of 4:40.33.

Records
, the existing World and Paralympic records were as follows.

Heats

Heat 1
10:01 8 September 2016

Heat 2
10:09 8 September 2016

Final
17:54 8 September 2016

References

Swimming at the 2016 Summer Paralympics